Wollaton Park is a 500 acre park in Nottingham, England, which includes a deer park.  It is centred on Wollaton Hall, a classic Elizabethan prodigy house which contains the Nottingham Natural History Museum, with the Nottingham Industrial Museum in the stable block.  

Various events including concerts are held in the park.  The park has an active volunteering programme to support the upkeep of the park, run by the Friends of Wollaton Park.

History
The enclosure of Wollaton Park required the destruction of the village of Sutton Passeys. It was enclosed by Henry Willoughby, 6th Baron Middleton with a  red brick wall at the start of the nineteenth century.

In this park during World War II, American troops of the 508th Parachute Infantry Regiment, part of the US 82nd Airborne Division, were billeted, waiting to be parachuted into Europe, which they did in June 1944. A small plaque commemorates this event. Subsequently German prisoners of war were billeted here for employment in the locality between 1945 and 1947.

Other buildings
In addition to Wollaton Hall the park hosts the following historic buildings:

Lenton Lodge

Lenton Lodge is one of the Gatehouses built around the boundary of Wollaton Park. It was commissioned by Henry Willoughby, 6th Baron Middleton. It was designed by the architect Jeffry Wyatville and completed in 1825. It is built in the Elizabethan Revival style.

With the sale of part of the park for residential building, Lenton Lodge is now separated from the rest of the park, and stands isolated but prominent on Derby Road in Lenton. It was sold by Nottingham City Council in the early 1980s .

A 99-year revolving lease was acquired by Moiz Saigara in 1996. Planning permission to convert Lenton Lodge to a single dwelling was obtained and major restoration work was undertaken by Moiz Saigara, using Julian Owen Associates as the architect. The main part of this work -apart from restoration and installation of services – was filling in the middle archway in such a way as to be able to connect the two wings without detracting from the appearance which identifies the building as a gatehouse. The Lodge was used by Moiz Saigara as his residence from 1996 to 2006, when the lease was sold to Chek Whyte.

In 2006-8 Lenton Lodge was restored by Chek Whyte Industries and sold as a  office in 2009. It was occupied by Global Fire and Security for six years, and sold to the University of Nottingham in 2016.

Beeston Lodge

It was designed by the architect Jeffry Wyatville around 1832. It is built of coursed Gritstone ashlar in a heavy Gothic style with "martello-type" round outer towers with battlements. The square central gatehouse is connected to the towers at the second floor level. It has an arched carriage entrance with an oriel window above. It was built following the Nottingham Reform riots in October 1831, and is now a Grade II listed building.

Nature
The park is home to herds of red deer and fallow deer. Each night there is a large corvid roost at the park, made up of rook, jackdaw, and carrion crow. Other bird species present at the site include jay, nuthatch and sparrowhawk. Migrating wildfowl grace the lake in the winter and species of note include gadwall, shoveler, wigeon and tufted duck. There is a good diversity of fungi present, especially in the winter months, mainly found near the wooded areas and the lake. Northern pike have been spotted swimming in the lake.

In 2017 local news reported that a pair of ring-necked parakeets had been seen in the park. These exotic birds have been breeding in London for several decades and spreading across the country, with sightings in Peterborough, Manchester, Liverpool, and even as far north as Edinburgh. In 2018 there are at least four parakeets living wild in Wollaton Park.

Events 

Wollaton Park is often used for major events, including:
 Splendour music festival held annually in July.
 Nottingham Autokarna, typically in June. 
 Intercounties Cross Country trials in March of each year, and has hosted the English Schools Cross Country. February 2014, 2017 and 2020 saw the English National Cross Country Championships.
 Nottingham Steam and Country Show, typically in May.
 In 2011, key scenes from the Batman movie The Dark Knight Rises were filmed in Wollaton Park. Wollaton Hall was featured as the latest Wayne Manor.
 In 1985 and 1989, it hosted the RAC Rally for WRC.

References

External links

Nottingham Industrial Museum Official Site
Friends of Wollaton Park

Parks and open spaces in Nottinghamshire